The Sirens Sang of Murder is a book written by Sarah Caudwell and published by Delacorte Press (owned by Random House) on 1 October 1989 which later went on to win the Anthony Award for Best Novel in 1990.

References 

Anthony Award-winning works
British mystery novels
British thriller novels
1989 British novels
Collins Crime Club books